Mecyclothorax cooki is a species of ground beetle in the subfamily Psydrinae. It was described by Perrault in 1986.

References

cooki
Beetles described in 1986